Apple pie is a dessert made from apples and pastry.

Apple Pie or apple-pie may also refer to:

Film and television
 Apple Pie, a 1976 film with Irene Cara
 Apple Pie (TV series), a 1978 American sitcom
 "Apple Pie" (Teletubbies), a 1999 television episode

Music
 Apple Pie (band), a Russian progressive rock band
 Apple Pie (album), by Nice, 1993
 "Apple Pie", a song by Fiestar, 2016
 "Apple Pie", a song by Michel Berger featuring Bill Withers, 1982
 "Apple Pie", a song by Teenage Joans from Taste of Me, 2021
 "Apple Pie", a song by Todrick Hall from Forbidden, 2018
 "Apple Pie", a song by Travis Scott from Rodeo, 2015

Other uses
 Apple Pie ABC, an alphabet rhyme for children
 Apple Pie Hill, an elevation in Burlington County, New Jersey, US
 Epilobium hirsutum, a wild plant with the local name apple-pie